This list comprises all players who participated in at least one league match for California Victory during their only season in the USL in 2007. Players who were on the roster but never played a first team game are not listed; players who appeared for the team in other competitions (US Open Cup, CONCACAF Champions League, etc.) but never actually made an USL appearance are noted at the bottom of the page where appropriate.

A "†" denotes players who only appeared in a single match.

A
  Omar Aguayo
  Luis Aguilar
  Mike R Anderson

B
  Josh Barton
  Federico Bianchi

C
  Hugo Casillas
  Aaron Chandler

D
  Cameron Dunn

E
  Juan Epitié

F
  Matthew Fitzgerald

H
  Josh Hansen
  Ricky Herron

I
  Patrick Ianni

J
  Dominik Jakubek

K
  Chuck Kim

L
  Matt Languis

M
  Kiel McClung
  Luis Mira
  Yuri Morales
  Mike Muñoz

O
  Edwardo Oliveria

P
  Raul Palomares

R
  Mike Randolph
  Eric Reed
  José Retiz

S
  Ricardo Sánchez
  Christopher Schwarze
  Ronald Silva
  Daniel Smith
  Ryan Suarez

T
  Josh Tudela

Sources

California Victory
 
Association football player non-biographical articles